Red triangle may refer to:

Societal symbols
Bass Brewery's "iconic red triangle" trademark, England's first registered trademark.
Red triangle (badge), a Nazi concentration camp badge worn upright by prisoners of war, and worn inverted for political prisoners.
A symbol on the Brazilian state flag of Minas Gerais
Red triangle (Channel 4), British television content warning system symbol
Red Triangle (family planning), the symbol for family planning health and contraception services

Nature
Red Triangle (Pacific Ocean), a shark-infested Pacific Ocean region off the northern California coast
Red triangle slug, a species of land slug from Australia

See also
Red Triangle (production team), songwriters / producers
The alchemical symbol for Fire (classical element)
The "Red Triangle Circus", a fictional gang in the film Batman Returns
Red Triangle, the parent company of the Alvis Car Company